Daegu Metro is a metro system that serves primarily the South Korean city of Daegu, operated by Daegu Metropolitan Transit Corporation from 5:30AM to 0:00AM with the interval from 5 to 8 minutes between each car's arrival. As of 2015, the number of average daily passengers is 186,992 people for Line 1, 177,984 people for Line 2, and 69,127 people for Line 3.

History
The construction of Daegu Metro was recommended to the city after the City of Daegu conducted the research in 1985 to find the ways to improve the city's transit. Following the establishment of the committee to oversee the new metro transit construction in September 1989, the study was conducted from 1989 to 1990 to evaluate whether the construction project was feasible. The guidelines for the metro transit's construction and operation was approved in January 1991. While the guideline focused on solving the traffic issues due to the overpopulation of the downtown area, it set the consequent goals of improving the city with more efficiency resulting from shorter commuting times, cleaner environment with reduced auto traffic and energy expense, larger outreach to bring the transit to those outside the urban area, and improved transportation capacity.

Line 1

The construction of Daegu Metro Line 1 began in December 1991 and the first 10.3km long section between Jincheon and Jungang-ro began on November 26th, 1997. The line serves its function to connect the southwestern area of the downtown to the city's east.

Line 2

In June 2007, the line was extended to connect the three newly built metro stations in the neighboring city of Gyeongsan.

Line 3

The construction of Line 3 was completed between Gyeongbook University Hospital's Chilgok campus and Yongji on May 17th, 2009. Being operated as a light rail system with monorails, the line is also commonly referred as Sky Rail.

Future plans
The transport department has approved the plan to build the Automated Guideway Transit line in Daegu. The color of AGT line will be purple.

Lines

Fare
The fare is 1,400 won for a token to any stop on the subway and only 1,250 won with the use of a transportation card.

Rolling stock
Daegu Metro lines are segregated, each with its own distinct vehicles. Lines 1 and 2 use the same railway technology (rapid transit), while Line 3 uses an entirely different system (monorail).

Accidents and incidents 
On 28 April 1995, a gas explosion occurred during the construction of Line 1 near the District of Sangin. 101 people near the site, including 53 students, were killed and 143 people were injured.

On 18 February 2003, Daegu subway fire broke out when an arsonist set fire to a train during the rush hour, killing 192 people and injuring 148 people. The incident raised the great concerns and consequent awareness in the public safety of the metro transit, prompting the city to replace the subway car's internal materials to be more flame retardant, placing the emergency gas masks and respirators within the subway cars, and improving the safety guidelines.   

In December 2008, the Daegu Safety Theme Park opened with the goal to educate and raise awareness of the public metro safety to the city's people as well as visitors.

Network map

See also
Transport in South Korea
 List of metro systems
 List of monorail systems

References

External links
Daegu Metropolitan Subway – official website  
Daegu at UrbanRail.net 

 
Transport in Daegu
Underground rapid transit in South Korea
Train-related introductions in 1995